Lakshmi de Silva is a translator, writer and critic from Sri Lanka. In 2000, her work was shortlisted for the Gratiaen Prize. She has also received the Sahithyarathna Award for lifetime achievement.

Biography 
De Silva has been a lecturer in English at the University of Kelaniya. In 2000, her translation of Henry Jayasena’s play Kuveni was shortlisted for the Gratiaen Prize.

Publications 
 De, S. L. (2004). 12 centuries of Sinhala poetry: A Sri Lankan anthology. Colombo, Sri Lanka: Vijitha Yapa Publications.

References 

Living people
Year of birth missing (living people)
Academic staff of the University of Kelaniya
Sri Lankan translators